Hubertus Schmidt (born 8 October 1959) is a German equestrian and Olympic champion. He won a gold medal in team dressage at the 2004 Summer Olympics in Athens with the team from Germany.

Hubertus was a mainstay of the German team with his famous mare Wansuela Suerte, and he has trained many other horses to Grand Prix. He is currently (2010) the coach for the Swedish team.  He teaches at Fleyenhof stable in Germany.

References

External links 
 
 
 
 

1959 births
Living people
German dressage riders
Olympic equestrians of Germany
German male equestrians
Equestrians at the 2004 Summer Olympics
Olympic gold medalists for Germany
Olympic medalists in equestrian
Medalists at the 2004 Summer Olympics